Forever Evil (also known as Nemesis) is a 1987 American horror film directed  by Roger Evans, who also co-edited the film. It stars Red Mitchell, Tracey Huffman, and Charles L. Trotter.

Plot
Three couples meet for one last party before vacating a lakeside cabin. As the couple play cards, Holly goes to shower. A scream is heard and Holly is discovered in the shower dead, her entrails ripped open and her baby (she was pregnant) gone. Marc Denning becomes the sole survivor of a bloody massacre which claims the lives of his lover, his brother, and three friends. Another of the women is found hung upside down in the living room, her throat cut, while the last woman is dragged out the window by a tree branch, apparently to her death. Something with glowing red eyes attacks the men. After being assaulted by a zombie-like creature whose eye he rips out, Denning stumbles to the nearby highway where he is hit by a car.

He wakes up in the hospital with a broken leg and three broken ribs. The police begin to investigate the murders. Shortly after the murders, Denning also begins to look for answers that will explain the slaughter.

Meanwhile, a red-caped Tarot reader named Brother Magnus reads the cards for an unidentified Southern-accented woman. He tells her she has to leave urgently. As she does so, she is attacked by something. Then a shadowy red-eyed cowled figure appears in the doorway of Magnus's house.  He shoots at it, but the bullets bounce off. The cowled figure zaps Magnus with an energy ray.

Denning is investigating at the library when a woman, Reggie, a survivor of a previous massacre, introduces herself. These two then travel with the detective, Lieutenant Leo Ball, to the house of a psychic, Ben, who had assisted Leo previously. Ben is identical to Brother Magnus. He has left a box of old books for Leo to examine. These include The Necronomicon, a book called Lost Gods, one called The Gate and the Key by C. D. Ward  and The Chronicles of Yog-Kothag. Denning becomes convinced that the murders are sacrifices rather than serial killings, especially when he reads a letter left by Ben that says "He's coming back." Denning takes "he" to refer to the old god, Yog-Kothag.

Reggie and Denning join forces over coffee at Denning's house, where a sinister dog who showed up before shows up again. Leo teaches Denning to use a gun, while Denning shows him a magazine article about quasars. He has a theory that the killings coincide with pulsings of certain quasars in certain years. Leo is skeptical.

Reggie and Denning go to a movie called The Jet Benny Show.  Leo receives a document via mail which he opens and then remails to Denning. As goes to mail the envelope, Leo witnesses a boiling cloud and a ray that zaps a car. Shortly after, he is attacked by something and dies. Denning wakes from a dream, realizing Leo is in trouble and races to the scene. The police are taking Leo's body away.

Denning maintains contact with a professor via telephone regarding the pulsing of quasars. One is set to pulse on the coming Thursday. He also realizes, after his secretary, Lisa plots the killings on a map, that the killings form a pentagram, which is the 'evil' symbol of Yog-Kothag as depicted in the Yog-Kothag book. At the center of the pentagram lies the Nash real estate agency. Denning explains that Yog-Kothag  was an old god who was 'so bad that the other gods ganged up on him and imprisoned him on a quasar.'

The zombie reappears and attacks Denning and Reggie. They try to kill it multiple times, thrusting a firepoker through it, hitting it with their car and finally setting its body on fire, but it comes back to life each time.  Finally, it tracks them and, after Reggie confesses she is in love with Denning, the zombie stabs Denning with a mystical dagger. Denning extracts the dagger and stabs the zombie with it.

Nash seems to witness the reappearance of Holly. She rips open her womb and takes out a baby, which falls to the ground. It appears demonic and has glowing red eyes. Slightly later Nash appears to be attacked by this baby, but then he awakes - it was only a dream.

Reggie goes to confront Nash, witnessing the sinister dog again and soon learns Nash has superhuman powers. He is resistant to bullets and is able to prevent a paperweight that she throws at his head from striking him. Nash shows Reggie the document which Leo mailed to Denning, but which never arrived. It is Nash's birth certificate, showing that he was born over a hundred years ago.  The apparent mysterious and supernatural cult dedicated to bringing Yog-Kothag back to Earth is in fact just ash, and his zombie. Together they committed a series of periodic ritual murders over the last decades. The zombie is now dead, but Nash reveals that Denning has been transformed into a new zombie. Yog-Kothag speaks through Denning with a warning. Denning then asserts himself and stabs Nash with the mystical dagger.

The film ends as Nash seems to be drawn screaming into the cosmic void. Yog-Kothag's voice is heard proclaiming "You have failed me!"

Cast 
 Red Mitchell as  Marc 
 Tracey Huffman as Reggie 
 Charles L. Trotter as Leo 
 Howard Jacobsen as Nash
 Kent T. Johnson as Zombie  
 Diane Johnson as Holly

Release

Home media
Forever Evil was released in heavily edited form on VHS in May 1990. It was later released for the first time on DVD by VCI Video on November 30, 2004. VCI would later re-release the film on September 11, 2012 as a part of its "Scream Theater Double Feature" movie pack alongside Children Shouldn't Play With Dead Things (1972).

Critical response

Forever Evil received a mostly negative response from critics upon its initial release, with many calling it another "Evil Dead rip-off".

Author John Stanley gave the film a negative review, stating that the film "only comes to life with the appearance of a zombie-like creature that cannot be killed, and the efforts of hero and heroine to do the monster in." In his book The Complete H.P. Lovecraft Filmography, author Charles P. Mitchell stated that "although marketed as an explicit horror film, it is actually a rather thoughtful picture rather than a gorefest. Unfortunately, it is overlong, and occasionally bogged down with too many irrelevant subplots. The script stresses the mystery elements of the story, making its revelations in piecemeal fashion in an attempt to retain audience interest...Forever Evil may be a letdown, but it is a sincere and worthwhile attempt, given the resources at hand."

The film was not without its supporters. Drew Beard fromHorrorNews.net called it "[an] enjoyably awful mid-80s low-budget horror", stating that, although its varied performances, clichéd story, poor direction, special effects, and pacing greatly hindered the film overall; he felt the film was still enjoyable enough to warrant subsequent viewings. Scott Aaron Stine gave the film a mixed review, criticizing the film's poor make-up/special effects, and overuse of jumpscares instead of actual tension. However, Stine commended the film's script as being "above-average" and "non-formulaic", stating that the film was "interesting enough to keep the viewer from finding something constructive to do."

References

Bibliography

External links
 
   
 
 
 Welcome to My Nightmare- An 18-chapter account by director Evans recalling the making of the film.

1987 films
1987 horror films
1987 independent films
1980s supernatural horror films
American independent films
American splatter films
American supernatural horror films
American zombie films
Cthulhu Mythos films
American dark fantasy films
Demons in film
Films shot in Houston
1980s English-language films
1980s American films